Sergio Luis Henao Montoya (born 10 December 1987) is a Colombian racing cyclist, who rides for the Denver Disruptors.

Early life
Henao was born in Rionegro in 1987, the same year that the Colombian rider Luis Herrera won the Vuelta a España.

Career

Early years
In 2005 Henao won two stages of the Junior Vuelta del Porvenir, and finished second overall behind Rigoberto Urán. He also finished second in the junior Vuelta a Venezuela. For 2007, he joined the  team and started to ride outside of his native South America. He recorded 15th overall in the Vuelta a la Comunidad de Madrid, two stages of the Venezuelan Clasico Ciclistico Banfoandes race, and a second overall in the Norte de Sandander followed.

In 2008 he won the under-23 version of the Vuelta a Colombia, picking up two stages along the way; two years later he repeated the feat in the main race, winning two stages and the general classification. In 2011, in one of his last races before moving to Europe, he won the opening prologue of the Tour of Utah, and then extended his lead on the first stage when he was involved in a five-man break with riders including Levi Leipheimer.

2012
In 2012 he made his professional debut, joining compatriot and friend Rigoberto Urán at  after signing a two-year contract. Henao finished 13th overall in the Vuelta al Pais Vasco in April, and also rode the Ardennes Classics, recording 21st place in Amstel Gold, 14th place in La Flèche Wallonne and 29th in Liège–Bastogne–Liège

In May, Henao was selected to be part of 's Giro d'Italia squad. He performed strongly in his first grand tour, with two top ten stage finishes (4th on Stage 15, 9th on Stage 20), he also wore the White Jersey of the best young rider for two days, taking the jersey over from, and relinquishing it to teammate and eventual classification winner Urán. Henao performed strongly in the final time trial moving up two places on the overall classification to finish ninth, and second in the young rider classification. Following the Giro, Henao rode the Tour de Pologne, where he finished third overall after finishing second on Stage 6. He represented Colombia in the Olympic Road Race and finished 16th. He then went on to finish second overall in the Vuelta a Burgos. Henao also rode then Vuelta a España in support of Chris Froome, and finished 14th overall. He then participated in the UCI Road World Race Championships, finishing ninth in the Road Race. Henao rounded off an impressive season with fifth place in the Giro di Lombardia.

2013

Henao's 2013 season began at the Mallorca Challenge races, where he placed second in the Trofeo Serra de Tramuntana and ninth in the Trofeo Platja de Muro. He then rode the Volta ao Algarve, and won stage 3 to finally take his first victory in Sky colours. Henao also won the third stage of the Tour of the Basque Country. The victory put Henao into the lead of both the general classification and points classification.

2014
For the 2014 season Henao was joined at Team Sky by his cousin Sebastián Henao.

In March 2014 Team Sky announced that they would remove Henao from the team's race schedule for eight weeks after they raised questions about the results of out-of-competition tests Henao undertook after he returned to Rionegro in October 2013 for the winter. Team Sky principal Dave Brailsford noted that the team's ability to interpret Henao's results was hampered by a lack of research into the physiology of "altitude natives" who grew up in high-altitude environments and that the team would commission independent research to shed light on the situation. Subsequently, in June 2014 the team announced that the research programme, conducted by researchers at the University of Sheffield with the cooperation of Colombian anti-doping agency, had been completed, the findings had been sent to WADA, the UCI and the Colombian Anti-Doping Federation, and that Henao would return to competition at the 2014 Tour de Suisse. However, whilst reconnoitering the time trial course with teammates, Henao was hit by a car, suffering a fractured knee cap and ruling him out for the rest of the 2014 season.

2015
Henao made his comeback at the Settimana Internazionale di Coppi e Bartali, where he helped teammate Ben Swift finish second overall. He then rode the Tour of the Basque Country where he finished second on Stage 3 to take the race lead. He held the lead until the final time trial on Stage 6, where his fourth place was not enough to deny Joaquim Rodríguez overall victory by 13 seconds over Henao.

2016

Henao started his 2016 season at the Tour Down Under, where he finished third overall and won the mountains classification, going on to finish as runner up in the Colombian National Road Race Championships. His first European race of the year was Paris–Nice in March, where he finished sixth in the general classification and played a crucial role in successfully defending teammate Geraint Thomas' lead on the final stage by closing down several attacks by Alberto Contador. He continued his good form into April, where he was runner up at the GP Miguel Induráin and at the Tour of the Basque Country, where he also topped the points classification.

On 20 April, it was announced that Henao had been withdrawn from racing after the UCI opened a biological passport investigation against him, relating to the same readings as had caused his withdrawal in 2014. Henao himself said that he was "calm and confident that this [would] be resolved soon", while Dave Brailsford stated that "We believe in Sergio." He noted that the UCI's investigation so far had been anonymous and hoped that the UCI investigation would reach the same conclusions as the team had from the 2014 research. He was named in the start list for the Tour de France. Henao was one of Chris Froome's key mountain domestiques as he won the race for the third time.

Henao represented Colombia in the Olympic Road Race. Henao formed part of a six-man attack on the first of three Vista Chinesa Circuit loops, and on the final climb broke clear with Vincenzo Nibali and Rafał Majka. However, Henao and Nibali crashed out of the race on the final descent, suffering a broken collarbone.

2017

Henao started the year by winning the Colombian National Road Race Championships. In March he won the Paris–Nice race by a gap of two seconds after managing to fend off a final-day attack from 's Alberto Contador.

Major results

2007
 1st  Overall Clásico Ciclístico Banfoandes
1st Stages 4 & 6
 3rd Time trial, National Under-23 Road Championships
 3rd Overall Vuelta a Antioquia
1st Stage 3
2008
 1st  Overall Vuelta a Colombia Under-23
1st Stages 2 & 5
2009
 1st  Overall Grand Prix du Portugal
1st Stage 3
 1st  Overall Cinturón a Mallorca
1st Stage 4
 2nd Overall Tour de Beauce 
 3rd Overall Coupe des nations Ville Saguenay
1st Stage 3
2010
 1st  Overall Vuelta a Colombia
1st  Points classification
1st Stages 1 (TTT), 4 & 10
 2nd Overall Clásico RCN
1st Stage 7
 2nd Overall Vuelta a Antioguia
1st Prologue (TTT) & Stage 3
 5th Overall Vuelta a Guatemala
2011
 1st Stage 2 Clásico RCN
 2nd Overall Tour of Utah
1st Prologue & Stage 5
 2nd Overall Vuelta a Antioquia
1st Stage 2
 4th Overall Vuelta a Colombia
1st Stage 2a (TTT)
2012
 2nd Overall Vuelta a Burgos
 3rd Overall Tour de Pologne
 3rd Trofeo Deià
 4th Gran Piemonte
 5th Giro di Lombardia
 9th Road race, UCI Road World Championships
 9th Overall Giro d'Italia
Held  after Stages 16–17
2013
 1st Stage 3 Volta ao Algarve
 1st Stage 2 (TTT) Giro d'Italia
 2nd La Flèche Wallonne
 2nd Trofeo Serra de Tramuntana
 3rd Overall Tour of the Basque Country
1st Stage 3
 5th Overall Tour de Pologne
 6th Amstel Gold Race
 9th Trofeo Platja de Muro
2014
 7th Overall Tour of Oman
 10th Trofeo Serra de Tramuntana
2015
 2nd Overall Tour of the Basque Country
 3rd Overall Tour of California
 7th La Flèche Wallonne
 7th Liège–Bastogne–Liège
 8th Overall Tour de Pologne
1st Stage 6
 9th Giro di Lombardia
2016
 2nd Road race, National Road Championships
 2nd Overall Tour of the Basque Country
1st  Points classification 
 2nd GP Miguel Induráin
 3rd Overall Tour Down Under
1st  Mountains classification
 6th Overall Paris–Nice
2017
 1st  Road race, National Road Championships
 1st  Overall Paris–Nice
 3rd GP Miguel Induráin
 4th La Flèche Wallonne
 6th Amstel Gold Race
 8th Overall Tour of the Basque Country
2018
 1st  Road race, National Road Championships
 4th Overall Colombia Oro y Paz
 9th Liège–Bastogne–Liège
2019
 8th Overall Tour Colombia
  Combativity award Stage 7 Vuelta a España
2020
 10th Overall Tour Colombia
2021
 8th Overall Settimana Internazionale di Coppi e Bartali
2022
 4th Overall Joe Martin Stage Race

General classification results timeline

Classics results timeline

References

External links

 Sergio Henao profile at Team Sky
 

1987 births
Living people
People from Rionegro
Colombian male cyclists
Cyclists at the 2012 Summer Olympics
Cyclists at the 2016 Summer Olympics
Olympic cyclists of Colombia
Sportspeople from Antioquia Department
21st-century Colombian people